Mobile phone throwing is an international sport that started in Finland in the year 2000. It's a sport in which participants throw mobile phones and are judged on distance or technique. World record holder is Dries Feremans with an official Guinness World Record throw of 110m 42cm.

There are usually four categories in the sport:
Original (also called "Traditional"): an over-the-shoulder throw with the farthest distance winning (best of three)
Freestyle: contestants get points for aesthetics and creativity choreography
Team original: up to three competitors have one throw each with their scores added together
Junior: for children aged twelve or younger

The phones used vary not just between events but between competitors, with any phone that weighs over 220 grams being acceptable.  At some events, the choice is down to personal preference from those provided by the event organisers, while others provide only one model of phone.

Rules
The sponsor provides the phones used in the Mobile Phone Throwing World Championships. There are many different kinds of phones to choose from, weighing between 220g to 400g. Every competitor can choose between any of the phones that are provided. During the throw, the competitor must stay within the throwing area. If the thrower steps over the area, the throw will be disqualified. The phone must land within the marked throwing sector. The official jury of the competition will accept or disqualify the throw. Also, there is no drug testing but if the Jury believes the competitor is not mentally or physically able to throw they will not let them. The jury's decisions are also final and cannot be protested.
 Rules for Juniors: Traditional over-the-shoulder throw Only for children 12 years and under (ID must be presented if asked) The one who can throw it the farthest is the winner, one throw per competitor.
 Rules for Freestyle: No age limits Team and individual series, teams can comprise from men or women, max. 3 people per team the style and aesthetics will be judged. The overall appearance is crucial, the jury of 3 will judge the performance, grading is from 1 to 6 points the competitor with the highest score wins, one throw per competitor.  
 Rules for Original: Traditional over-the-shoulder throw. Only the length of the throw counts, the one who can throw the mobile phone the furthest is the winner, one throw per competitor, own series for men and women.
 Rules for Team Original: Traditional over-the-shoulder throw Max. 3 persons per team. Teams can either be men or women, team members' scores will be summed up and the highest score wins one throw per competitor.

History
Mobile Phone Throwing became a hit when first arranged in year 2000 in Savonlinna, Finland. Organizer was a translation and interpretation company Fennolingua. Its multi-national personnel and many athletics threw away their frustrations along with the mobile phones. Local recycling centers were a partner and they collected all the toxic waste.
The Mobile Phone Throwing World Championships has been arranged every year since the year 2000 in Savonlinna in late August. All the international interest on the Championships has now led to official national championships all over Europe. The first national championships were organized in Trondheim, Norway in June 2004. The first prize was a trip to the World Championships to Savonlinna, Finland. In February 2005 there were the first winter championships in Stoos, Switzerland. The winners from both Original and Freestyle categories won trips to the World Championships to Savonlinna. The first German championships were arranged in June 2005 in Northern Germany. People could also buy a new mobile phone at the Championships. The winner gets a new mobile phone. Throwers and international media were immediately very interested and every year the Championships gathered a wide range of nationalities to Savonlinna to throw the cell phones.

Lawrence University has hosted a Rotary Phone Throw in 2005, 2006, and 2007. This competition has similar rules to the mobile phone throw, yet uses rotary phones.

Recycling
Nokia, which was one of the leading cell phone giants in the world, has its headquarters in Finland. Lead organizer Christine Land was inspired to create the event back in 2000. Back in the first event, a leading insurance company in Finland sponsored the event for recycling purposes. According to insurance companies, there are a lot of cell phones lying in thousands of lakes all around Finland. Many phones are returned to their mobile carrier stores in return for a new one; however, others are discarded instead of being recycled and they become toxic waste. The battery in the cell phone can ultimately become a toxic waste and it must be taken care of properly.

Millions of phones are replaced all over the world in favor for new ones. About 70 percent of overall toxic in landfills is made up of electronic scraps. Recycling these electronics hasn't been made a huge priority in a lot of places all over the world. Many of the cell phones that we currently use contain products like plastic and metal that can be recycled on a daily basis. These being recycled can easily save energy. When these metals and plastics are place into landfills, they can pollute the air and contaminate some of our drinking water.

Lead, which comes in the coating of the cell phone, is a toxic element that can result in serious health effects when in high levels. When electronic waste is burned, it can produce toxic fumes that are very dangerous. Mobile phone recycling is a very important issue that insurance companies that sponsor the Mobile Phone Throwing Championships are very aware of.

World and national championships
The Mobile Phone Throwing World Championships have been held annually since 2000 in Savonlinna, Finland. The first national competition was held in Trondheim, Norway, in June 2004, with several other countries across Europe also staging their own events. The first winter championships were held in Stoos, Switzerland, in February 2005. Commonly, the prize for first place in a national event is entry to the world championships, and the grand prize for winning the world championship is a new mobile phone. Many events are supported by mobile phone recycling organizations and promote the recycling of the phones.

In the UK, the championships are held every August and organized by 8th Day UK Ltd. The first event, in 2005, was held at Richmond Golf Driving Range, and the 2006 event at Tooting Bec Athletics Track in London. ActionAid Recycling partnered the event to raise awareness for mobile phone recycling and raised money from donated phones for the first two years, but due to the involvement of a casino (Golden Palace) in the 2007 event and the associations this would have in relation to charity, are no longer involved.

In 2007, the UK event was held at Old Hamptonians Rugby Club on 12 August, with throws recorded from 3.70 m to 95.83 m, a new unofficial world record. The men's winner was Chris Hughff, and the ladies' winner was Jan Singleton, both successfully defending their 2006 titles. There were also throws recorded by a penguin and a gorilla, prompting a new category — fancy dress – to be incorporated for 2008. The 2008 competition was held at the same location, with Jan Singleton defending her title and Jeremy Gallop claiming the men's title. Madeleine James set a new benchmark for the Under 3 Category of 1.57 m.

The 2007 world championships were in Savonlinna as usual. The winner of the men's freestyle event, Taco Cohen of the Netherlands, won for a novel performance that incorporated juggling and acrobatics.

Two thousand nine saw the UK event move to Battersea Park Athletics Stadium, with Jeremy Gallop (89.10 m) defending his title and Julia Geene (33.40 m) winning the ladies' event. Peter Yates set a new Vets record of 75.20 m, and Oliver James set an Under 2 record of 2.05 m. The fancy dress event was won by Morph, who threw 54.73 m. The event was run alongside the Sumo Suit Athletics World Championships.

In 2010, the event was again held together with the Sumo Suit Athletics World Championships in Battersea Park Athletics track. Both Jeremy Gallop and Julia Geens successfully defended their titles, with throws of 88.51 m and 32.00 m respectively. In the men's event, there was a 1st prize of an Xbox 360 sponsored by BuyMobilePhones.net in an effort to raise awareness about mobile recycling.

The World event for 2010 was to be held on 21 August 2010 but for unknown reasons (as yet), was canceled.

On August 24, 2013, the World Mobile Phone Throwing Championships took place in Savonlinna, Finland. Over eighty people from six different countries participated in the event that has grown immensely since its conception in 2000. The 2013 Champion for the Men's Traditional Division, Riku Haverinen, cast his 220-gram mobile device a staggering 97.7 meters (the length of a full soccer field.)  This is five meters short of the World record of 102.68 m set in 2012 by Chris Hughff from Great Britain. Coming in second in the Men's Traditional Division was Ikka Aaltonen with 87.88 m, followed by Otto Sammalisto with a valiant effort of 86.09 m. These three top performers, all from Finland, represented the host country in the 2013 Championships. In the Women's Traditional Division, the champion Asa Lundgren threw her mobile device 40.41 m, impressive as it was only after a few times practicing. The Women's Traditional Division was much closer than the Men's, with second place with a score of 39.88 m from Louise Van De Ginste, Belgian winner from earlier in the summer of 2013. Van De Ginste was followed by third-place finisher Tanja Pakarinen, who launched a mobile device 36.69 m. Again the Finns dominated the competition with two of the top three finishers being from Finland. The Freestyle division was won by Erika Vilpponen, with a stellar performance with a circus bike paired with a throw of the mobile device backwards over the shoulder. It was a clear victory for Erika according to the panel of judges. After this year's championships, new divisions are being looked at for future championships.

Other tournaments

The Spanish championships are held in Tarragona, Catalonia, during the celebrations of Carnival in February or March. The 2009 tournament was held on Sunday, 22 February in the Francoli Park, Tarragona.

United States
On August 1, 2008, the United States held its first national championship in South Hadley, Massachusetts, at Buttery Brook Park, sponsored by Family Wireless. The United States event has also dedicated itself to recycling cellular phones.

There was a second cell phone throwing contest held in the United States on July 5, 2009, at Szot Park in Chicopee, Massachusetts. It was sponsored by Family Wireless. The finalist for the American event was Daniel Taylor from San Diego, California. He threw an iPhone for a distance of 78.9 yards (Approx. 72.15 meters.)

Czech Republic
The first Czech mobile phone throwing tournament was held in June 2012 by non-profit organization ASEKOL which collects waste electrical and electronic equipment. The championship was held to inform people about separation of electric waste. It took place in Prague and world records were set in both men's and women's categories. Men's record was beaten later in Savonlinna but the women's record from Czech Republic is still the best one in its category. It was set by Tereza Kopicová who threw a cell phone 60.24 meters.

Liechtenstein
The first National Championships for Liechtenstein were held on 29 May 2010 in the town Ruggell. They were completed in accordance with the Finnish rules with the same four categories.

Johannes Heeb won in the men's category with a throw of 74.2 m, and the women's category was won by Stephanie Parusel, throwing 48.5 m.
Manuel Hug won the juniors with a throw of 55.9 m, while the team category was won by Team "Schulzentrum Unterland" with 196 m. The Team consisted of the two 9th grade pupils Mert Dogan and Benjamin Gstoehl and their sports teacher Florian Wild who by the way made the farest throw in the competition with 86.4m.
The current Swiss national record holder, Dino Roguljic, made a "celebrity" appearance and managed to throw 66.2 m.

Freestyle
Freestyle phone throwing is an event held in which contestants enter a mat that is around 1" thick to soften the impact in case a phone is dropped. Players begin performing a series of tricks that include various flips, spins, high throws, etc. If one drops one's mobile phone, he or she is automatically out, and judges take his score from that point. One minute is given for a total "run time", and after the minute is up if one has not dropped one's phone, he or she gets a score from 1 to 100. Phone classes include standard phones, which are free, to $50 phones with either no moving device such as slide or flip open, or with the standard flip open style. The second class is the "Advanced" class, which includes phones with full keyboards, slide movement devices, side-kick flip devices, or touch screens. This class is based on the fact that if the phone is dropped, there is more of a consequence since the phones are so elaborate and/or expensive.

Belgium
The first National Championships for Belgium were held in July 2006 in Ghent. Since 2010 JIM Mobile is organizing the event. Last year's champion had a throw of 62.70 m. The Belgian Champion of 2011 had a throw of 63.94 m. More info can be found at mobilepoint.pentamediatechnologies.comor www.jimmobile.be.
On 27 August 2014 javelin thrower Dries Feremans threw a world record of 110m42 in Kessel-Lo.

Austria
In August 2016 in Korneuburg the "Internationalen Österreichischen Mobiltelefonweitwurfmeisterschaften" were hosted by Tw!ne. Winner of the event was Jürgen Eberhart with a distance of 62,80m. 
On the 23. September 2017 the Austrian Athletics Federation organized a competition during a public sports day in Vienna. 8 young javelin throwers competed in this event and were throwing iPhones. Adam Wiener won the event with 92,34m and his Sister Ivonne had a distance of 67,58m. oelv.at

Records
The current records are:
Men's world record -  Dries Feremans (August 2014).
Women's world record -  Ivonne Wiener (September 2017)

Men's seasons best
(Updated  June 2019)

Top ten men's best throwers of all time
(Updated June 2019)

Men's national records
(Updated June 2019)

Women's seasons best
(Updated June 2019)

Top ten women's best throwers of all time
(Updated June 2019)

Women's national records
(Updated  June 2019)

Record Sources:

References

External links
 Finland's Official website
 Competition in India
 Competition in Vienna(AUT) 2017

Individual sports
Savonlinna
Throwing
Throwing sports
Games and sports introduced in 2000
Electronics and the environment
Sports originating in Finland